Chike Osita Onyejekwe (born December 9, 1986 in Hațeg, Romania) is a Romanian handballer who plays as a left wing for Liga Națională club CSM Bucharest.

He was born in Hațeg to a Romanian mother and Nigerian father, both intellectuals. One of his sisters, Nneka, plays volleyball professionally.

Achievements
Liga Națională:
Gold: 2011, 2012
Bronze: 2013 
Cupa României:
Winner: 2011

References

1986 births
Living people
People from Hunedoara County
Romanian male handball players
HC Dobrogea Sud Constanța players
Romanian people of Nigerian descent